William Thomson Stewart (17 January 1887 – 23 November 1974) was a Scottish amateur footballer who played in the Scottish League for Queen's Park as a centre half.

Personal life 
Stewart served as a private in the Highland Light Infantry during the First World War.

Career statistics

References 

1887 births
Military personnel from Glasgow
Scottish footballers
Scottish Football League players
British Army personnel of World War I
Association football wing halves
Queen's Park F.C. players
1974 deaths
Footballers from Glasgow
Highland Light Infantry soldiers
Shawfield F.C. players
People from Bridgeton, Glasgow
Scottish Junior Football Association players